The 2010 Belarusian Super Cup was held on 8 March 2010 between the 2009 Belarusian Premier League champions BATE Borisov and the 2008–09 Belarusian Cup winner Naftan Novopolotsk. The match was drawn at the end of regulation time and BATE went on to win the match 3–2 in penalties.

Match details

See also
2009 Belarusian Premier League
2008–09 Belarusian Cup

References

Belarusian Super Cup
Super
Belarusian Super Cup 2010
Belarusian Super Cup 2010